A penumbral lunar eclipse will take place on June 17, 2038.

Visibility

Related lunar eclipses

Lunar year series (354 days)

Saros series 

Lunar Saros 111, repeating every 18 years and 11 days, has a total of 71 lunar eclipse events including 11 total lunar eclipses. The first total lunar eclipse of this series was on April 19, 1353, and last was on August 4, 1533. The longest occurrence of this series was on June 12, 1443 when the totality lasted 106 minutes.

Tritos series 
 Preceded: Lunar eclipse of June 5, 2020
 Followed: Lunar eclipse of April 5, 2042

Tzolkinex 
 Preceded: Lunar eclipse of May 7, 2031

See also 
List of lunar eclipses and List of 21st-century lunar eclipses

Notes

External links 
 

2038-06
2038-06
2038 in science